"Alles aus Liebe" (All from love) is a song by the German punk rock band Die Toten Hosen. It is the third single and the twelfth track from the album Kauf MICH!.

The song is narrated by a man, who doesn't know how to correctly express and emphasise his love towards a woman and decides to commit a suicide to prove his love. However, in the end of the song he decides, that they should go together. In the end of the song, three shots are heard.

There is also an English version of the song, titled "All for the Sake of Love", which appeared on Love, Peace & Money.

Music video
The video was directed by Hans Neleman. In it, Campino sings to a woman beside a window.

Track listing
 "Alles aus Liebe" (Frege/Frege) – 4:34
 "Auf dem Weg zur Nr. Eins" (On the way to no. one) (Rohde/Frege) − 4:01
 "5 Minuten" (5 minutes) (von Holst/Frege) − 3:01

Charts

Tout pour sauver l'amour

A French version of the song, titled "Tout pour sauver l'amour" (All to save love), was released as a promo single in 1995. The single is subtitled En duo avec Marina (In a duet with Marina), as it features Marina Casariego on female vocals.

Track listing
 "Tout pour sauver l'amour" (Frege/Casariego) – 4:31
 "Tout pour sauver l'amour" (French Karaoke Version) – 4:42

1996 live version

A live version of the song is available on the 1996 live album Im Auftrag des Herrn. This was released as the only single from the album in 1997. The single had a crew-T-shirt with it.

Music video
The video was directed by Sven Offen & DoRo.

Track listing
 "Alles aus Liebe" (Frege/Frege) − 4:10
 "Lügen" (Lies) (von Holst/Frege) − 4:03
 "Seelentherapie" (Soul therapy) (Breitkopf/Frege) – 4:48

Charts

Cover Versions
The song was covered by the Polish band Ich Troje with the title "A wszystko to (bo ciebie kocham)". Moreover, a live version of this cover exists in duet with the singer Anna Wyszkoni.

1993 singles
Die Toten Hosen songs
Songs written by Campino (singer)
1993 songs
Virgin Records singles